The black-fronted wood quail (Odontophorus atrifrons) is a bird species in the family Odontophoridae, the New World quail. It is found in Colombia and Venezuela.

Taxonomy and systematics

Some authors have suggested that the black-fronted wood quail and gorgeted wood quail (Odontophorus strophium), Tacarcuna wood quail (O. dialeucos), Venezuelan wood quail (O. columbianus), and black-breasted wood quail (O. lecuolaemus) are actually a single species, but this treatment has not been accepted by the major avian taxonomic systems.

The black-fronted wood quail has three subspecies, the nominate O. a. atrifrons, O. a. variegatus, and O. a. navai.

Description

Males are estimated to weigh  and females . Both sexes have a distinctive black forehead ("front"), face, and throat. Adult males of the nominate subspecies have a reddish brown crown, a gray back with black vermiculation, and a browner rump. The closed wing shows small white spots. Its breast is blackish brown. The adult female is similar but has more reddish underparts. The juvenile is similar to the female. O. a. variegatus has a larger area of black on the crown than the nominate, its back is browner with a more intricate pattern, and its wings and belly have cinnamon tones. O. a. navai also has a larger area of black on the crown and its body is drab dark brown with no reddish tones.

Distribution and habitat

The nominate subspecies of black-fronted wood quail is found in the Sierra Nevada de Santa Marta of northeastern Colombia. O. a. variegatus is found at the northern end of Colombia's eastern Andes. O. a. navai is found in Serranía del Perijá, which straddles the Colombia-Venezuela border.

Behavior

Feeding

The black-fronted wood quail forages in coveys of up to 10 birds, scratching in leaf litter for insects and berries.

Breeding

The black-fronted wood quail's breeding season appears to span at least from May to August. One nest has been found; it was a bed of dried leaves and small sticks in a hollow in the ground and contained three eggs.

Vocalization

The black-fronted wood quail's advertising call is a "rhythmic, whistled, series" described as "bob-a-white". It also has a rattling call and "gabbling calls" among covey mates.

Status

The IUCN originally assessed the black-fronted wood quail as Near Threatened but has classed it as Vulnerable since 2000 "owing to its small range and population, both of which must be declining in response to habitat loss. The range is small and fragmented with recent records from only one area [as of 2016]."

References

External links
Black fronted WoodQuail - Odontophorus atrifrons. Video:  L E Urueña & J A Borras.
BirdLife International Species Factsheet.

black-fronted wood quail
Birds of the Colombian Andes
Birds of the Serranía del Perijá
Birds of the Sierra Nevada de Santa Marta
black-fronted wood quail
Taxonomy articles created by Polbot